Pycnoloma is a monotypic moth genus in the family Geometridae. It contains only one species, Pycnoloma rufibasalis, which is found in New Guinea. Both the genus and species were first described by William Warren in 1906.

References

Eupitheciini
Taxa named by William Warren (entomologist)
Moth genera